The Destruction in Art Symposium (a.k.a. DIAS) was a gathering of a diverse group of international artists, poets, and scientists to London from 9–12 September, 1966. Included in this number were representatives of Fluxus and other counter-cultural artistic undergrounds who were there to speak out on the theme of destruction in art.

The Honorary Committee, led by Gustav Metzger, attracted the attention of both the international media and international art community to the symposium. The symposium was mainly held at the Africa Centre in Covent Garden, London.

Objective
A Destruction in Art Symposium press release claimed that the main objective of DIAS was to focus attention on the element of destruction in Happenings and other art forms and to relate it to the actual destruction taking place within society.

Happenings
Happenings took place in venues all over London, including Conway Hall. At Africa Centre, co-owner of Indica Gallery, John Dunbar, saw Yoko Ono's performances of Cut Piece and invited her to make an exhibition for Indica. John Latham constructed three large Skoob Towers out of books called The laws of England and set fire to them outside the British Museum. Raphael Montañez Ortiz destroyed a piano for his Duncan Terrace Piano Destruction Concert. Guy Pro-Diaz produced his work Painting with Explosion at the Freeschool Playground in London, on 12 September 1966.

Destruction in Art Symposium USA

Inspired by London's Destruction in Art Symposium, artists Geoffrey Hendricks and Ralph Ortiz organized a free Destruction in Art Symposium USA event on March 22nd 1968 at the Judson Church Gallery in New York City. Performing participants were Hermann Nitsch, Nam June Paik, Al Hansen, Bici Hendricks, Charlotte Moorman, Ralph Ortiz, and Lil Picard.

Honorary Committee
Mario Amaya
Roy Ascott
Enrico Baj
Bob Cobbing
Ivor Davies
Jim Haynes
Sylvester Houédard
Gustav Metzger (Honorary Secretary)
Barry Miles
Frank Popper
John J. Sharkey
Wolf Vostell

Participants
The following artists were involved in DIAS: 
Gustav Metzger
Al Hansen
Raphael Montañez Ortiz
Wolf Vostell
John Latham
Robin Page
Yoko Ono
Günter Brus
Otto Mühl
Hermann Nitsch
Guy Pro-Diaz
Peter Weibel
Juan Hidalgo
Henri Chopin
Kurt Kren

The following artists are said to have participated in DIAS in absentia:

Ivor Davies
Fred Hunter
Barbara Steveni
Jasia Reichardt
Werner Schreib
John J. Sharkey
Biff Stevens
Garry A. Jones
Christopher A Whittaker
Photographers:
Tom Picton
John Prosser
Hanns Sohm (collector)

See also
Anti-art
Viennese Actionism
Fluxus
Kristine Stiles

References

External links
 International Times (1966) - 'Two views of DIAS' by Jay Landesman and Tony Cox
 Tate - Art & the Sixties, exhibition themes, Destruction in Art Symposium
 Destruction in Art Symposium - Fotos, poster, text

Art criticism